Ernie Jennings (born January 30, 1949) is a former American football wide receiver who played college football at the United States Air Force Academy and attended Kansas City Central High School in Kansas City, Missouri. He was drafted by the San Francisco 49ers in the tenth round of the 1971 NFL Draft. Jennings had originally joined the Air Force Falcons as a defensive back. He was a consensus All-American in All-American in 1970 and finished eighth in Heisman Trophy voting after catching 74 passes for 1,289 yards. He also led NCAA Division I football in receiving touchdowns in 1970 with 17. He is Air Force's all-time leader in receptions with 148, 2nd in receiving yards with 2,392 and leads the team in receiving touchdowns with 28. Jennings was on the 2014 ballot for induction into the College Football Hall of Fame but was not chosen. Jennings spent time in the military after college and was released by the San Francisco 49ers in August 1975.  He then began a career at NASA in 1976.

References

Living people
1949 births
Players of American football from Kansas
American football wide receivers
African-American players of American football
Air Force Falcons football players
All-American college football players
People from Atchison, Kansas
21st-century African-American people
20th-century African-American sportspeople